Pseudodrephalys is a genus of South American skipper butterflies in the family Hesperiidae.

Species
Pseudodrephalys atinas Mabille, 1888
Pseudodrephalys hypargus Mabille, 1891
Pseudodrephalys sohni Burns, 1998

References
Natural History Museum Lepidoptera genus database

Pyrgini
Hesperiidae genera
Taxa named by John Burns (entomologist)